Volyn Oblast is subdivided into districts (raions) which are subdivided into territorial communities (hromadas).

Current

On 18 July 2020, the number of districts was reduced to four. These are:
 Kamin-Kashyrskyi (Камінь-Каширський район), the center is in the city of Kamin-Kashyrskyi;
 Kovel (Ковельський район), the center is in the city of Kovel;
 Lutsk (Луцький район), the center is in the city of Lutsk;
 Volodymyr (Володимирський район), the center is in the city of Volodymyr  (previously Volodymyr-Volynskyi).

Administrative divisions until 2020

In 2020, Volyn Oblast was subdivided into 20 regions: 16 districts (raions) and 4 city municipalities (mis'krada or misto), officially known as territories governed by city councils.

Cities under the oblast's jurisdiction:
Lutsk (Луцьк), the administrative center of the oblast 
Kovel (Ковель)
Novovolynsk Municipality 
Cities under the city's jurisdiction:
Novovolynsk (Нововолинськ)
Urban-type settlements under the city's jurisdiction:
Blahodatne (Благодатне), formerly Zhovtneve
Volodymyr-Volynskyi (Володимир-Волинський)
Districts (raions):
Horokhiv (Горохівський район)
Cities under the district's jurisdiction:
Berestechko (Берестечко)
Horokhiv (Горохів)
Urban-type settlements under the district's jurisdiction:
Marianivka (Мар'янівка)
Senkevychivka (Сенкевичівка)
Ivanychi (Іваничівський район)
Urban-type settlements under the district's jurisdiction:
Ivanychi (Іваничі)
Kamin-Kashyrskyi (Камінь-Каширський район)
Cities under the district's jurisdiction:
Kamin-Kashyrskyi (Камінь-Каширський)
Kivertsi (Ківерцівський район)
Cities under the district's jurisdiction:
Kivertsi (Ківерці)
Urban-type settlements under the district's jurisdiction:
Olyka (Олика)
Tsuman (Цумань)
Kovel (Ковельський район)
Urban-type settlements under the district's jurisdiction:
Holoby (Голоби)
Liublynets (Люблинець)
Liubeshiv (Любешівський район)
Urban-type settlements under the district's jurisdiction:
Liubeshiv (Любешів)
Liuboml (Любомльський район)
Cities under the district's jurisdiction:
Liuboml (Любомль)
Urban-type settlements under the district's jurisdiction:
Holovne (Головне)
Lokachi (Локачинський район)
Urban-type settlements under the district's jurisdiction:
Lokachi (Локачі)
Lutsk (Луцький район)
Urban-type settlements under the district's jurisdiction:
Rokyni (Рокині)
Torchyn (Торчин)
Manevychi (Маневицький район)
Urban-type settlements under the district's jurisdiction:
Kolky (Колки)
Manevychi (Маневичі)
Ratne (Ратнівський район)
Urban-type settlements under the district's jurisdiction:
Ratne (Ратне)
Zabolottia (Заболоття)
Rozhyshche (Рожищенський район)
Cities under the district's jurisdiction:
Rozhyshche (Рожище)
Urban-type settlements under the district's jurisdiction:
Dubyshche (Дубище)
Shatsk (Шацький район)
Urban-type settlements under the district's jurisdiction:
Shatsk (Шацьк)
Stara Vyzhivka (Старовижівський район)
Urban-type settlements under the district's jurisdiction:
Stara Vyzhivka (Стара Вижівка)
Turiisk (Турійський район)
Urban-type settlements under the district's jurisdiction:
Lukiv (Луків)
Turiisk (Турійськ)
Volodymyr-Volynskyi (Володимир-Волинський район)
Cities under the district's jurisdiction:
Ustyluh (Устилуг)

References

Volyn
Volyn Oblast